Salz is a municipality  in the district of Rhön-Grabfeld in Bavaria in Germany.

Notable people 
 Ludwig Elsbett, German engineer and inventor

References

Rhön-Grabfeld